These were the team rosters of the nations participating in the women's ice hockey tournament of the 2018 Winter Olympics.

Group A

Canada
The following is the Canadian roster for the women's ice hockey tournament at the 2018 Winter Olympics.

Head coach:  Laura Schuler       Assistant coaches:  Dwayne Gylywoychuk,  Troy Ryan

Finland
The Finnish roster for the women's ice hockey tournament at the 2018 Winter Olympics was published on 22 January 2018.

Head coach:  Pasi Mustonen       Assistant coaches:  Juuso Toivola

Olympic Athletes from Russia
The following is the Olympic Athletes from Russia roster for the women's ice hockey tournament at the 2018 Winter Olympics.

Head coach:  Alexei Chistyakov     Assistant coach:  Alexander Vedernikov

United States
The following is the United States roster for the women's ice hockey tournament at the 2018 Winter Olympics.

Head coach:  Robb Stauber     Assistant coaches:  Brett Strot,  Paul Mara

Group B

Japan
The following is the Japan roster for the women's ice hockey tournament at the 2018 Winter Olympics.

Head coach:  Takeshi Yamanaka     Assistant coaches:  Yuji Iizuka,  Masahito Haruna

Korea
The following is the Korean roster for the women's ice hockey tournament at the 2018 Winter Olympics.

Head coach:  Sarah Murray     Assistant coaches:  Kim Do-yun,  Pak Chol-ho,  Rebecca Baker

Sweden
The following is the Swedish roster for the women's ice hockey tournament at the 2018 Winter Olympics.

Head coach:  Leif Boork       Assistant coaches:  Alexandra Cipparone,  Jared Cipparone

Switzerland
The following is the Swiss roster for the women's ice hockey tournament at the 2018 Winter Olympics.

Head coach:  Daniela Diaz       Assistant coaches:  Angela Frautschi,  Steve Huard

References

rosters

2018